Santa Rosa is a district of the Oreamuno canton, in the Cartago province of Costa Rica.

History 
Santa Rosa was created on 4 January 1938 by Acuerdo 1. Segregated from Cipreses.

Geography 
Santa Rosa has an area of  km² and an elevation of  metres.

Demographics 

For the 2011 census, Santa Rosa had a population of  inhabitants.

Transportation

Road transportation 
The district is covered by the following road routes:
 National Route 219
 National Route 402

References 

Districts of Cartago Province
Populated places in Cartago Province